I Am Tour may refer to:

I Am Tour (Leona Lewis), was 2016 tour by British singer and songwriter Leona Lewis.
I Am... World Tour (sometimes referred to as the I Am... Tour), was 2009 tour by American recording artist Beyoncé.

See also
I Am (disambiguation)